Sobolikha is a rural locality (a settlement) in Pribaykalsky District, Republic of Buryatia, Russia. The population was 186 as of 2010. There are 4 streets.

Geography 
Sobolikha is located by the Turka River, 125 km northeast of Turuntayevo (the district's administrative centre) by road. Turka is the nearest rural locality.

References 

Rural localities in Okinsky District